Flight to Freedom is an album by Cuban jazz trumpeter, pianist and composer Arturo Sandoval, first released on the GRP label in 1991.

Reception

The Allmusic review stated "On his American debut, Sandoval mostly performs boppish jazz (other than the dull "Marianela") with slight touches of rock and spiced with Latin percussion. The trumpeter shows restraint on the ballads (including a tasty "Body and Soul") and displays plenty of fire on the often-funky uptempo romps, not overdoing the effortless high notes. With the assistance of the high-powered tenor of Ed Calle, the versatile guitarist Rene Luis Toledo, and a variety of talented sidemen (including guest Chick Corea on three songs), Arturo Sandoval's long overdue debut is well-rounded, exciting, and highlighted by a fast rendition of Dizzy Gillespie's "Tanga”.”

Track listing
All compositions by Arturo Sandoval except as indicated

	"Flight to Freedom" (Danilo Pérez)
	"Last Time I Saw You" (Richard Eddy)
	"Caribeno"
     "Samba de Amore" (Rene Luis Toledo)
	"Psalm" (Chick Corea)
	"Rene's Song" (Rene Luis Toledo)
	"Body and Soul" (Frank Eyton, Johnny Green, Edward Heyman, Robert Sour)
	"Tanga" (Dizzy Gillespie)
	"Caprichosos de la Habana"
	"Marianela"

Personnel
	Backing Vocals – Ed Calle (tracks: 3), Orlando Hernandez (tracks: 3), Rene Luis Toledo* (tracks: 3)
	Bass – Anthony Jackson (tracks: 1, 2, 5), Nicky Orta* (tracks: 3, 4, 6 to 10)
	Co-producer – Richard Eddy
	Coordinator [Album] – Julia Fuller
     Cowbell – Arturo Sandoval (tracks: 3)
	Drums – Dave Weckl (tracks: 1, 2, 5, 7, 8, 10), Orlando Hernandez (tracks: 3, 4, 6, 9)
	Edited By [Digital] – Joseph Doughney, Michael Landy
	Electronic Wind Instrument [EWI] – Ed Calle (tracks: 3, 10)
	Engineer [Assistant Mixing] – David Amlen*, J.B. Chupick
	Engineer [Assistant Recording] – Jackie Brown, Neil DiGnon
	Executive-Producer – Dave Grusin, Larry Rosen
	Flugelhorn – Arturo Sandoval (tracks: 4, 6, 7, 10)
	Flute – Ed Calle (tracks: 4, 5)
	Guitar – Rene Luis Toledo* (tracks: 3, 4, 6, to 9)
	Lead Vocals – Arturo Sandoval (tracks: 3)
	Liner Notes – Arturo Sandoval
	Mastered By – Ted Jensen
	Mixed By [Digitally] – Carl Griffin, Richard Eddy
	Percussion – Arturo Sandoval (tracks: 9), Long John* (tracks: 1 to 9)
	Piano – Chick Corea (tracks: 1, 2, 5), Mike Orta* (tracks: 3, 4, 6 to 8)
	Producer – Joel Dorn
	Producer [Associate] – Carl Griffin
	Producer [Post-Production] – Joseph Doughney, Michael Landy
	Recorded By – Gene Paul
	Saxophone – Ed Calle (tracks: 1 to 3, 6, 8)
	Strings – Alfred Brown (tracks: 4, 7, 10), Elliot Rosoff (tracks: 4, 7, 10), Eugene Moye (tracks: 4, 7, 10), Gene Orloff (tracks: 4, 7, 10), Harry Zaratzian (tracks: 4, 7, 10), Jesse Levy (tracks: 4, 7, 10),John Pintavelle* (tracks: 4, 7, 10), Matthew Raimondi (tracks: 4, 7, 10), Max Ellen (tracks: 4, 7, 10),Sanford Allen (tracks: 4, 7, 10)
	Synthesizer – Arturo Sandoval (tracks: 8, 10), Danilo Perez (tracks: 1), Mike Orta* (tracks: 9), Richard Eddy (tracks: 2)
	Tenor Saxophone – Ed Calle (tracks: 9)
	Timbales – Arturo Sandoval (tracks: 3)
	Trumpet – Arturo Sandoval (tracks: 1 to 3, 5, 6, 8 to 10)
	Vocals – Arturo Sandoval (tracks: 9), Ed Calle (tracks: 9), Joel Dorn (tracks: 9), Julia Fuller (tracks: 9),Mike Orta* (tracks: 9), Nicky Orta* (tracks: 9), Orlando Hernandez (tracks: 9), Pete King (4) (tracks: 9), Rene Luis Toledo* (tracks: 9)

References

Arturo Sandoval albums
Afro-Cuban jazz albums
1991 albums